Dungee Corner Meadow is a  biological Site of Special Scientific Interest east of Bozeat in Northamptonshire.

This well drained hay meadow on boulder clay is traditionally managed, and no artificial fertilisers or herbicides have been used, so it has a diverse flora. More than twenty grass species have been recorded, including sweet vernal, Yorkshire fog, sheep's fescue, quaking grass and crested dog's-tail. There is also a population of the locally rare green-winged orchid.

The site is private land with no public access.

References

Sites of Special Scientific Interest in Northamptonshire